Shai Haddad (born 2 July 1987 in Ma'ale Adumim) is a Tunisian-Jewish Israeli footballer who currently plays for Hapoel Ashdod. He plays mainly as a right back, but can also be utilized as a midfielder.

Club career

Beitar Jerusalem
Haddad started his career in Beitar Jerusalem's youth program. On 16 August 2004, he made his senior debut in a Toto Cup match against Hapoel Haifa. In the 2006–07 season, he participated in the youth's team double win.

Haddad signed a senior contract with the club in the 2007–08 season. He made his premier league debut on 30 May 2008, coming on as a substitute in a match against Bnei Sakhnin. In the same season he also played in 3 Toto Cup matches.-

Hapoel Ramat Gan
Haddad was loaned to Hapoel Ramat Gan from the Liga Leumit for the 2008–09 season to let him play more matches, and he helped the team get promoted to the premier league. He then signed an extra year extension of his loan at Hapoel Ramat Gan. On 22 August 2009, he scored his debut goal in the premier league, equalizing the scores in a match against Maccabi Petah Tikva.

Back to Beitar
In 2010, Haddad returned to Beitar Jerusalem at the end of his loan contract. On 23 April 2011, he scored his debut goal with Beitar Jerusalem, in a 5–1 victory over Hapoel Ramat Gan.

In the 2012–13 season, he was moved by Eli Cohen from the midfield to a right back position.

At the end of the 2013–14 season, Haddad's contract ended and was not extended.

Petrolul Ploiești
On 16 October 2014, Haddad signed with Romanian side Petrolul Ploiești where his Israeli national teammate Toto Tamuz has been playing for half a season already. His contract was terminated only 2 months later.

Hapoel Ashdod
On 31 August 2020, Haddad signed in the Liga Alef club Hapoel Ashdod.

Career statistics

References

External links
 
 
 Profile page at Israel Football Association 
 

1987 births
Living people
Israeli footballers
Beitar Jerusalem F.C. players
Hapoel Ramat Gan F.C. players
FC Petrolul Ploiești players
F.C. Ashdod players
Hapoel Katamon Jerusalem F.C. players
Hapoel Ashkelon F.C. players
Hapoel Ashdod F.C. players
Israeli Premier League players
Liga Leumit players
Liga I players
Expatriate footballers in Romania
Israeli expatriate sportspeople in Romania
Israeli people of Tunisian-Jewish descent
Footballers from Ma'ale Adumim
Israeli settlers
Association football defenders